Aileen Fyfe  is a historian.

Academia
Fyfe formerly lectured on the history of science and technology, typically nineteenth-century, at NUI Galway, . Since 2011 she has been based at the University of St Andrews and is Director of Research for the School of History. Her research there is focused on the circulation and consumption of knowledge from the late seventeenth century onwards.

Fyfe is a member of the Council of the History of Science Society (USA). From 2002 to 2007 she was Treasurer of the British Society for the History of Science, and she was the Chair of the Royal Irish Academy's subcommittee on the History of Science until 2010.

From 2013-2017 she led an AHRC on Philosophical Transactions, the journal of the Royal Society of London. She was the lead author of the 2017 briefing paper Untangling Academic Publishing: a history of the relationship between commercial interests, academic prestige and the circulation of research which culminated from this research.

Since Spring 2021 she has been coordinating the 'Women Historians of St Andrews' project, which aims to seek out the experiences of women who studied, researched and taught History at St Andrews.

Selected publications

Fyfe, Aileen (2015), 'Journals, learned societies and money: Philosophical Transactions ca. 1750–1900', Notes and Records of the Royal Society, vol. 69, no. 3, pp. 277-299.
Fyfe, Aileen; McDougall-Waters, Julie; Moxham, Noah (2018), 'Credit, copyright, and the circulation of scientific knowledge: the Royal Society in the long nineteenth century', Victorian Periodicals Review, vol. 51, no. 4, pp. 597-615. 
Fyfe, Aileen; Squazzoni, Flaminio; Torny, Didier; Dondio, Pierpaolo (2020), 'Managing the growth of peer review at the Royal Society journals, 1865-1965', Science, Technology, and Human Values, vol. 45, no. 3, pp. 405-429.
Fyfe, Aileen; Gielas, Anna Maria (2020), 'Introduction: Editorship and the editing of scientific journals, 1750-1950', Centaurus, vol. 62, no. 1, pp. 5-20.

Awards and honours
Fyfe was awarded the 2013 Edelstein Prize, recognizing Steam-Powered Knowledge as best book on the history of technology. She was elected to the Fellowship of the Royal Society of Edinburgh in 2022.

References

External links
 "John Dalton" (link) In Our Time, BBC Radio 4. Aileen Fyfe on the panel with Jim Bennett and James Sumner.

Year of birth missing (living people)
Living people
Academics of the University of Galway
Academics of the University of St Andrews
British women historians
Historians of science
Historians of technology
21st-century British historians
21st-century British women writers
Fellows of the Royal Society of Edinburgh